Karasu is a town in Sakarya Province, northwestern Turkey, on the Black Sea coast. It has an overwinter population of around 30,746, which increases in the summer due to tourism. Much of its commerce centers on hazelnut farming and tourism.

The Acarlar Floodplain Forest is located partly in Karasu.

Economy
Historically, Karasu has produced zinc and lead, which they started mining in 1898. When World War I started, production in the area declined.

References

Populated places in Sakarya Province
Seaside resorts in Turkey
Populated coastal places in Turkey
Districts of Sakarya Province